Shakthi Leelai is a 1972 Tamil language film directed by T. R. Ramanna and produced by T. G. Somasundaram. The film script was written by Thuraiyur K. Moorthi. It starred B. Saroja Devi, Gemini Ganeshan, Jayalalithaa, K. B. Sundarambal and K. R. Vijaya. It is noted for being the last multi-starrer mythological film. The music was provided by T. K. Ramamoorthy. It was a successful film on its release. Later, The film was dubbed in 1976 into Hindi as Tu Hi Kali Tu Hi Durga and 1985 into Telugu as Parashakthi Mahimalu.

Cast 
 Gemini Ganeshan as Lord Shiva
 Ushanandini as Shakti/Samayapuram Mariamman
 Jayalalithaa as Periyapalayathu Bhavani amman/Punyakshi Devi
 Sivakumar as Narada Muni
 Major Sundararajan as Jamadagni Munivar
 Saroja Devi as Renukambal
 Usharani as Saraswati
 Master Sridhar as Parasuraman
 K. B. Sundarambal as Woman Saint
 S. V. Sahasranamam as The King
Senthamarai as The Minister
 A. V. M. Rajan as Prohit
 Manjula as Poonguzhali, a Classical dancer
 Gandhimathi as Poonkuzhali's Mother
 K. R. Vijaya as Thangam
 K. Vijayan as Thangam's Husband
 S. A. Ashokan as Vaana Sooran
 Manorama as Kaveri
 V. K. Ramasamy as Kaveri's Husband
 Pakoda Kadhar as Gopal, Kaveri's Adaptive Son
 V. Nagayya as Tamil Pandit Devi Daasan
 K. Kannan
 Shanmuga Sundaram as Brinkki Munivar
 Karikol Raju as Washerman
Udaiyappan as Vettiyan
 V. R. Thilagam as Vettiyan's Wife

Crew 
 Director: T. R. Ramanna
 Art: B. Nagarajan
 Stills: Lakshmanan
 Lyrics: Kannadasan
 Lyrics-help: Panchu Arunachalam
 Music: T. K. Ramamoorthy
 Cinematography: M. A. Rahuman
 Edited by: T. R. Srinivasalu
 Design: Eswar and Venkata Rao
 Publicity: Mars Advertising Bureau
 Processing: Gemini Colour Lab
 Properties: Cine Crafts and Nadha Muni & Sons
 Audiography: S. P. Ramanathan
 Re – Recording: S. P. Ramanathan
 Choreography: Pasumarthi Krishnamoorthy, Dhandayuthapani Pillai, B. S. Moorthy and Vimala

Soundtrack 
The music was composed by T. K. Ramamoorthy and Lyrics were written by Kannadasan. The playback singers consist of K. B. Sundarambal, T. M. Soundararajan, P. Susheela, L. R. Eswari, M. S. Rajeswari, M. R. Vijaya, Sarala and Pattu.

References

External links 
 

1970s musical films
1970s Tamil-language films
1972 films
Films about reincarnation
Films about royalty
Films about shapeshifting
Films directed by T. R. Ramanna
Hindu devotional films
Hindu mythological films
Indian dance films
Indian musical films
Religious epic films